Sirola is a surname. It may refer to:

 Yrjö Elias Sirola, né Sirén (1876–1936), a Finnish socialist politician
 Hannes Juho Rikhard Sirola (1890–1985), a Finnish gymnast
 Joseph Anthony Sirola (1929–2019), an American actor, director and producer; known as "The King of the Voice-Overs"
 Orlando Sirola (1928–1995), an Italian tennis player from Italy

See also 
 Širola, Croatian surname

Finnish-language surnames
Italian-language surnames